Spike Lee & Company: Do It a Cappella is a 1990 PBS documentary, directed by Spike Lee, around the topic of A cappella music. Artists that performed as part of the documentary include The Mint Juleps, Take 6, Ladysmith Black Mambazo, Rockapella and The Persuasions. It also stars Spike Lee, Debbie Allen and a cameo appearance by Samuel L. Jackson.

There is an Audio CD and MP3 available as well.

References

1990 in American television